Who Can I Turn To is a 1964 studio album by Tony Bennett.

Track listing
 "Who Can I Turn To?" (Leslie Bricusse, Anthony Newley) – 2:57
 "Wrap Your Troubles in Dreams (and Dream Your Troubles Away)" (Harry Barris, Ted Koehler,  Billy Moll) – 3:12
 "There's a Lull in My Life" (Mack Gordon, Harry Revel) – 3:06
 "Autumn Leaves" (Joseph Kosma, Johnny Mercer, Jacques Prévert) – 2:00
 "I Walk a Little Faster" (Cy Coleman, Carolyn Leigh) – 4:23
 "The Brightest Smile in Town" (Ray Charles, Barry De Vorzon, Robert B. Sherman) – 2:56
 "I've Never Seen" (Dorcas Cochran, Don Marcotte) – 3:10
 "Between the Devil and the Deep Blue Sea" (Harold Arlen, Ted Koehler) – 3:15
 "Listen, Little Girl" (Fran Landesman, Tommy Wolf) – 2:22
 "Got the Gate on the Golden Gate" (Mel Tormé) – 3:05
 "Waltz for Debby" (Bill Evans, Gene Lees) – 3:36
 "The Best Thing To Be Is a Person" (Alan Brandt, Bob Haymes) – 3:00

Personnel
 Tony Bennett - vocals
 Sonny Russo, Bill Byers, Bill Elton, Bart Varsalona - trombones
 Earl Chapin, James Buffington, Richard Berg, Arty DeRosa, Ralph Froelich, Brooks Tillotson - French horn
 Romeo Penque, Ray Beckenstein, Leon Cohen, Irving Horowitz - woodwinds
 Ralph Sharon - piano
 Mundell Lowe, Al Caiola, Wally Richardson - guitar
 Hal Gaylord - bass
 Billy Exiner - drums
 Teddy Sommer - percussion
 George Siravo - arranger, conductor

Strings
David Mankovitz, Al Brown, Calman Fleisig, Harold Furmansky - viola
Tosha Samaroff, George Ockner, Aaron Rosand, Julius Schacter, Paul Gershman, Sol Shapiro, Carmel Malin, Gene Orloff, Peter Dimitriades, Harry Lookofsky, Joe Malin, Max Pollikoff, Harry Urbont, Manny Green, Harry Katzman, Arthur Bogin, Leo Kahn, Leo Kruczek, Arnold Eidus - violin
Charles McCracken, George Ricci, George Koutzen, Peter Makas, Avron Twerdosky, Maurice Brown, Tony Sophos - cello

References

1964 albums
Tony Bennett albums
Columbia Records albums
Albums recorded at CBS 30th Street Studio
Albums arranged by George Siravo